Landgravine Louise of Hesse-Darmstadt may refer to:

 Landgravine Louise of Hesse-Darmstadt (1757–1830), daughter of Louis IX, Landgrave of Hesse-Darmstadt; wife of Charles Augustus, Grand Duke of Saxe-Weimar-Eisenach
 Landgravine Louise of Hesse-Darmstadt (1761–1829), daughter of Landgrave George William of Hesse-Darmstadt; wife of Louis I, Grand Duke of Hesse

See also
 Louise of Hesse-Kassel,  queen consort to King Christian IX of Denmark